While many nations boycotted the 1980 Summer Olympics in Moscow because of the 1979 Soviet invasion of Afghanistan, the country's pro-Soviet puppet government sent a team to Moscow.

Boxing

Wrestling

Men's freestyle

Men's Greco-Roman

References

Nations at the 1980 Summer Olympics
1980
1980 in Afghan sport